Apache Jackrabbit is an open source content repository for the Java platform. The Jackrabbit project was started on August 28, 2004, when Day Software licensed an initial implementation of the Java Content Repository API (JCR). Jackrabbit was also used as the reference implementation of JSR-170, specified within the Java Community Process. The project graduated from the Apache Incubator on March 15, 2006, and is now a Top Level Project of the Apache Software Foundation.

JCR specifies an API for application developers (and application frameworks) to use for interaction with modern content repositories that provide content services such as searching, versioning, transactions, etc.

Features
 Fine and coarse-grained content access
 Hierarchical content
 Structured content 
 Node types and mixins
 Property types - text, number, date
 Binary properties
 XPath queries
 SQL queries
 Unstructured content
 Import and export
 Referential integrity
 Access control
 Versioning
 JTA support
 Observation
 Locking
 Clustering
 Multiple persistence models

See also

 Apache Sling - a web framework for building applications on top of Apache Jackrabbit
 Hippo CMS - an Open Source content management system based on Apache Jackrabbit
 Jahia - Open Source ECM based on Apache Jackrabbit
 Magnolia (CMS) - an Open Source content management system based on Apache Jackrabbit
 OpenKM - Open Source KM based on Apache Jackrabbit
 Sakai Project - Open Source Collaboration and Learning Environment based on Apache Sling and Apache Jackrabbit
 Adobe Experience Manager - experience management system based on Apache Jackrabbit Oak, successor of the Day CQ content management system acquired by Adobe in 2010

References

External links
Jackrabbit's Home Page

Jackrabbit
Java enterprise platform
Structured storage